Woraksan, or Worak Mountain, is a major mountain of the Sobaek mountain range in South Korea. It forms part of the boundary between North Chungcheong and North Gyeongsang provinces. Its slopes contain portions of Mungyeong city in North Gyeongsang, as well as Danyang County, Jecheon City, and Chungju City in North Chungcheong. Woraksan National Park takes up 28% of the land in Danyang County.

Worak Mountain is the centerpiece of Woraksan National Park, and its slopes are home to numerous Buddhist shrines and historical sites. The area is known for its beauty and history, and is sometimes referred to as "Little Kumgang-san" to compare it with that famed Korean mountain.  The tenth-century Hubaekje leader Gyeon Hwon, who was born nearby, allegedly planned to build a palace on the slopes of Worak Mountain, although he was never able to do so. Woraksan was designated a "global park" in 2004 by the United Nations Environment Program and the World Conservation Monitoring Center.

See also
 List of mountains in Korea
 Geography of South Korea

References

External links
 Official site for Woraksan National Park

Mountains of South Korea
Mountains of North Chungcheong Province
Chungju
Mungyeong
Danyang County
Jecheon
Sobaek Mountains